Bimberamala River, a perennial river of the Clyde River catchment, is located in the Southern Tablelands and the upper ranges of the South Coast regions of New South Wales, Australia.

Course and features
Bimberamala River rises below Mount Budawang, on the eastern slopes of the Budawang Range, part of the Great Dividing Range and within Budawang National Park. The river generally flows northeast, then south, then east northeast, and finally north northeast, through Bimberamala National Park and Yadbro State Forest, joined by one minor tributary, before reaching its confluence with the Clyde River, north of the village of Brooman. The river descends  over its  course.

See also

 Rivers of New South Wales
 List of rivers of New South Wales (A–K)
 List of rivers of Australia

References

Rivers of New South Wales
South Coast (New South Wales)
Southern Tablelands